Kasautii Zindagii Kay may refer to:

 Kasautii Zindagii Kay (2001 TV series), an Indian soap opera
 Kasautii Zindagii Kay (2018 TV series), an Indian soap opera, reboot of the 2001 series